The Bretons (or Vretoned) are a Celtic ethnic group native to Brittany. They trace much of their heritage to groups of Brittonic speakers who emigrated from southwestern Great Britain, particularly Cornwall and Devon, mostly during the Anglo-Saxon settlement of Britain. They migrated in waves from the 3rd to 9th century (most heavily from 450 to 600) into Armorica, which was subsequently named Brittany after them.

The main traditional language of Brittany is Breton (Brezhoneg), spoken in Lower Brittany (i.e., the western part of the peninsula). Breton is spoken by around 206,000 people as of 2013. The other principal minority language of Brittany is Gallo; Gallo is spoken only in Upper Brittany, where Breton is less dominant. As one of the Brittonic languages, Breton is related closely to Cornish and more distantly to Welsh, while the Gallo language is one of the Romance langues d'oïl. Currently, most Bretons' native language is standard French.

Brittany and its people are counted as one of the six Celtic nations. Ethnically, along with the Cornish and Welsh, the Bretons are Celtic Britons. The actual number of Bretons in Brittany and France as a whole is difficult to assess as the government of France does not collect statistics on ethnicity. The population of Brittany, based on a January 2007 estimate, was 4,365,500. It is said that, in 1914, over 1 million people spoke Breton west of the boundary between the Breton- and Gallo-speaking region, roughly 90% of the population of the western half of Brittany. In 1945, it was about 75%, and today, in all of Brittany, at most 20% of Bretons can speak Breton. Brittany has a population of roughly four million, including the department of Loire-Atlantique, which the Vichy government separated from historical Brittany in 1941. Seventy-five percent of the estimated 200,000 to 250,000 Breton speakers using Breton as an everyday language today are over the age of 65.

A strong historical emigration has created a Breton diaspora within the French borders and in the overseas departments and territories of France; it is mainly established in the Paris area, where more than one million people claim Breton heritage. Many Breton families have also immigrated to the Americas, predominantly to Canada (mostly Quebec and Atlantic Canada) and the United States. The only places outside Brittany that still retain significant Breton customs are in Île-de-France (mainly Quartier de Montparnasse in Paris), Le Havre and in Îles des Saintes, where a group of Breton families settled in the mid-17th century.

History

Late Roman era
In the late fourth century, large numbers of British auxiliary troops in the Roman army may have been stationed in Armorica. The ninth-century Historia Brittonum states that the emperor Magnus Maximus, who withdrew Roman forces from Britain, settled his troops in the province.

Nennius and Gildas mention a second wave of Britons settling in Armorica in the following century to escape the invading Anglo-Saxons and Scoti. Modern archaeology also supports a two-wave migration.

It is generally accepted that the Brittonic speakers who arrived gave the region its current name as well as the Breton language, Brezhoneg, a sister language to Welsh and Cornish.

There are numerous records of Celtic Christian missionaries migrating from Britain during the second wave of Breton colonisation, especially the legendary seven founder-saints of Brittany as well as Gildas.

As in Cornwall, many Breton towns are named after these early saints. The Irish saint Columbanus was also active in Brittany and is commemorated at Saint-Columban in Carnac.

Early Middle Ages
In the Early Middle Ages, Brittany was divided into three kingdoms—Domnonée, Cornouaille (Kernev), and Bro Waroc'h (Broërec)—which eventually were incorporated into the Duchy of Brittany. The first two kingdoms seem to derive their names from the homelands of the migrating tribes in Britain, Cornwall (Kernow) and Devon (Dumnonia). Bro Waroc'h ("land of Waroch", now Bro Gwened) derives from the name of one of the first known Breton rulers, who dominated the region of Vannes (Gwened). The rulers of Domnonée, such as Conomor, sought to expand their territory, claiming overlordship over all Bretons, though there was constant tension between local lords.

Breton participation in the Norman Conquest of England
Bretons were the most prominent of the non-Norman forces in the Norman conquest of England. A number of Breton families were of the highest rank in the new society and were tied to the Normans by marriage.

The Scottish Clan Stewart and the royal House of Stuart have Breton origins. Alan Rufus, also known as Alan the Red, was both a cousin and knight in the retinue of William the Conqueror. Following his service at Hastings, he was rewarded with large estates in Yorkshire. At the time of his death, he was by far the richest noble in England. His manorial holding at Richmond ensured a Breton presence in northern England. The Earldom of Richmond later became an appanage of the Dukes of Brittany.

Modern Breton identity

Many people throughout France claim Breton ethnicity, including a few French celebrities such as Marion Cotillard, Suliane Brahim, Malik Zidi, Patrick Poivre d'Arvor, Yoann Gourcuff, Nolwenn Leroy and Yann Tiersen.

After 15 years of disputes in the French courts, the European Court of Justice recognized Breton Nationality for the six children of Jean-Jacques and Mireille Manrot-Le Goarnig; they are "European Citizens of Breton Nationality". In 2015, Jonathan Le Bris started a legal battle against the French administration to claim this status.

Breton diaspora
The Breton community outside Brittany includes Bretons across the other regions of France including the Greater Paris, Le Havre, and Toulon, as well as in other countries including Canada and the United States. In Paris, Bretons used to settle in the neighborhood around the Montparnasse train station, which is also the terminus of the Paris-Brest railway.

Bretons in the United States
Famous Breton Americans and Americans of Breton descent include John James Audubon, Jack Kerouac, and Joseph-Yves Limantour.

Between 1885 and 1970, several thousands Bretons immigrated to the United States, many of them leaving the Black Mountains of Morbihan. In June 2020, a replica of the Statue of Liberty was dedicated in Gourin, Morbihan to celebrate the legacy of these emigrants.

Culture

Religion
The Breton people are predominantly members of the Catholic Church, with minorities in the Reformed Church of France and non-religious people. Brittany was one of the most staunchly Catholic regions in all of France. Attendance at Sunday mass dropped during the 1970s and the 1980s, but other religious practices such as pilgrimages have experienced a revival. This includes the Tro Breizh, which takes place in the shrines of the seven founding saints of Breton Christianity. The Christian tradition is widely respected by both believers and nonbelievers, who see it as a symbol of Breton heritage and culture.

Breton religious tradition places great emphasis on the "Seven Founder Saints":
 Paul Aurelian, at Saint-Pol-de-Léon (Breton: Kastell-Paol),
 Tudwal (Sant Tudwal), at Tréguier (Breton: Landreger),
 Brioc, at Saint-Brieuc (Breton: Sant-Brieg, Gallo: Saent-Berioec),
 Malo, at Saint-Malo (Breton: Sant-Maloù, Gallo: Saent-Malô),
 Samson of Dol, at Dol-de-Bretagne (Breton: Dol, Gallo: Dóu),
 Padarn, at Vannes (Breton: Gwened),
 Corentin (Sant Kaourintin), at Quimper (Breton: Kemper).

Pardons
A pardon is the patron saint's feast day of the parish. It often begins with a procession followed by mass in honour of the saint. Pardons are often accompanied by small village fairs.
The three most famous pardons are:
 Sainte-Anne d'Auray/Santez-Anna-Wened
 Tréguier/Landreger, in honour of St Yves
 Locronan/Lokorn, in honour of St Ronan, with a troménie (a procession, 12 km long) and numerous people in traditional costumes

Tro Breizh
There is an ancient pilgrimage called the Tro Breizh (tour of Brittany) which involves pilgrims walking around Brittany from the grave of one of the Seven Founder Saints to another. Nowadays pilgrims complete the circuit over the course of several years. In 2002, the Tro Breizh included a special pilgrimage to Wales, symbolically making the reverse journey of the Welshmen Paul Aurelian, Brioc, and Samson. According to Breton religious tradition, whoever does not make the pilgrimage at least once in his lifetime will be condemned to make it after his death, advancing only by the length of his coffin every seven years.

Folklore and traditional belief
Some pagan customs from the old pre-Christian tradition remain the folklore of Brittany. The most powerful folk figure is the Ankou or the "Reaper of Death".

Language

The Breton language is a very important part of Breton identity. Breton itself is one of the Brittonic languages and is closely related to Cornish and more distantly to Welsh. Breton is thus an Insular Celtic language and is more distantly related to the long-extinct Continental Celtic languages such as Gaulish that were formerly spoken on the European mainland, including the areas colonised by the ancestors of the Bretons.

In eastern Brittany, a regional langue d'oïl, Gallo, developed; it shares certain areal features such as points of vocabulary, idiom, and pronunciation with Breton but is a Romance language. Neither language has official status under French law; however, some still use Breton as an everyday language (particularly the older generation) and bilingual road signs are common in the west of Brittany.

From 1880 to the mid-20th century, Breton was banned from the French school system and children were punished for speaking it in a similar way to which English, not Welsh, was used in Welsh schools during the 18th and early 19th centuries. The situation changed in 1951 with the Deixonne Law allowing Breton language and culture to be taught 1–3 hours a week in the public school system on the proviso that a teacher was both able and prepared to do so. In modern times, a number of schools and colleges have emerged with the aim of providing Breton-medium education or bilingual Breton/French education.

There are four main Breton dialects: Gwenedeg (Vannes), Kerneveg (Cornouaille), Leoneg (Leon) and Tregerieg (Trégor), which have varying degrees of mutual intelligibility. In 1908, a standard orthography was devised. The fourth dialect, Gwenedeg, was not included in this reform, but was included in the later orthographic reform of 1941.

Breton-language media
Newspapers, magazines and online journals available in Breton include Al Lanv, based in Quimper, Al Liamm, Louarnig-Rouzig, and Bremañ.

There are a number of radio stations with broadcasts in the Breton language, namely Arvorig FM, France Bleu Armorique, France Bleu Breizh-Izel, Radio Bro Gwened, Radio Kerne, and Radio Kreiz Breizh.

Television programmes in Breton are also available on France 3 Breizh, France 3 Iroise, TV Breizh and TV Rennes. There are also a number of Breton language weekly and monthly magazines.

Music

Fest-noz
A fest-noz is a traditional festival (essentially a dance) in Brittany. Many festoù-noz are held outside Brittany, taking regional Breton culture outside Brittany. Although the traditional dances of the fest-noz are old, some dating back to the Middle Ages, the fest-noz tradition is itself more recent, dating back to the 1950s.
Fest-Noz was officially registered on Wednesday, December 5, 2012, by UNESCO on the "Representative List of the Intangible Cultural Heritage of Humanity."

Traditional dance
There are many traditional Breton dances, the most well-known being gavottes, an dro, the hanter dro, and the plinn. During the fest-noz, most dances are practised in a chain or in a circle (holding a finger); however, there are also dances in pairs and choreographed dances with sequences and figures.

Traditional Breton music
Two main types of Breton music are a choral a cappella tradition called kan ha diskan, and music involving instruments, including purely instrumental music. Traditional instruments include the bombard (similar to an oboe) and two types of bagpipes (veuze and binioù kozh). Other instruments often found are the diatonic accordion, the clarinet, and occasionally violin as well as the hurdy-gurdy. After World War II, the Great Highland bagpipe (and binioù bras) became commonplace in Brittany through the bagadoù (Breton pipe bands) and thus often replaced the binioù-kozh. The basic clarinet (treujenn-gaol) had all but disappeared but has regained popularity over the past few years.

Modern Breton music
Nowadays groups with many different styles of music may be found, ranging from rock to jazz such as Red Cardell, ethno-rock, Diwall and Skeduz as well as punk. Some modern fest-noz groups also use electronic keyboards and synthesisers, for example Strobinell, Sonerien Du, Les Baragouineurs, and Plantec.

Breton cuisine

Breton cuisine contains many elements from the wider French culinary tradition. Local specialities include:
 Crêpe – froment (sweet)
 Galette – buckwheat (savory)
 Chouchenn – a type of Breton mead
 Fars forn (far breton) – a kind of sweet suet pudding with prunes
 Kouign-amann – butter pastry
 Krampouezh (crêpes or galettes) – thin pancakes made either from wheat or buckwheat flour; usually eaten as a main course
 Lambig – apple eau de vie
 Sistr – cider
 Caramel au beurre salé - salted butter caramel

Symbols of Brittany
Traditional Breton symbols and symbols of Brittany include the national anthem Bro Gozh ma Zadoù based on the Welsh Hen Wlad Fy Nhadau. The traditional motto of the former Dukes of Brittany is Kentoc'h mervel eget bezañ saotret in Breton, or Potius mori quam fœdari in Latin. The "national day" is observed on 1 August, the Feast of Saint Erwann (Saint Yves). The ermine is an important symbol of Brittany reflected in the ancient blazons of the Duchy of Brittany and also in the chivalric order, L’Ordre de l’Hermine (The Order of the Ermine).

See also
 Celtic Britons
 Armorica
 Breton nationalism
 Brittany
 British migration to France
 Brythons
 Celtic nations
 Cornish language
 Cornwall
 History of Brittany
 List of Breton authors
 List of Breton poets
 List of Breton saints
 Wikipedia in Breton

Images of Brittany

Notes

References

Bibliography
 Léon Fleuriot, Les origines de la Bretagne, Bibliothèque historique Payot, 1980, Paris,
 Christian Y. M. Kerboul, Les royaumes brittoniques au Très Haut Moyen Âge, Éditions du Pontig/Coop Breizh, Sautron – Spézet, 1997,
 Morvan Lebesque, Comment peut-on être Breton ? Essai sur la démocratie française, Éditions du Seuil, coll. « Points », Paris, 1983,
 Myles Dillon, Nora Kershaw Chadwick, Christian-J. Guyonvarc'h and Françoise Le Roux, Les Royaumes celtiques, Éditions Armeline, Crozon, 2001,.

External links
Breizh.net – a non-profit association dedicated to the promotion of Brittany and the Breton language on the Internet Breizh.net
 Bretagnenet.com
 Gwalarn.org
 Kervarker.org
 Skolober.com
 Francenet.fr
 Person.wanadoo.fr
 Preder.net
 Dicts.info
 Wordgumbo.com
 Online Breton radio
 Antourtan.org
 Ramsisle.com
 Bremañ – Breton language magazine
 Ofis ar Brezhoneg (l'Office de la langue bretonne)

 
Brythonic Celts
Celtic ethnic groups
Indigenous peoples of Europe